Nowy Klincz  is a village in the administrative district of Gmina Kościerzyna, within Kościerzyna County, Pomeranian Voivodeship, in northern Poland. The village has a total population of 586.

For details of the history of the region, see History of Pomerania.

References

Nowy Klincz